Corazones al límite (English: Hearts to the Limit) is a Mexican telenovela produced by Roberto Hernández Vázquez for Televisa in 2004.

On Monday, March 15, 2004, Canal de las Estrellas started broadcasting Corazones al límite weekdays at 7:00pm, replacing Clap, el lugar de tus sueños. The last episode was broadcast on Friday, October 1, 2004, with Rebelde replacing it the following Monday.

Erika Buenfil, Arturo Peniche, Sara Maldonado, and Aarón Díaz starred as protagonists, while Sherlyn, Arleth Terán, Jorge de Silva, and Susy-Lu Peña starred as antagonists.

Plot 
Diana (Sara Maldonado) teenage girl, who was emotionally neglected from her parents, and felt unwanted. After being expelled from her boarding school in Switzerland, Diana goes back to live with her parents. Diana's aunt, Pilar, comes over and witnesses a great deal fighting and tension within the household.

She offers solace to Diana by letting her live with her. Diana goes to the mall where she bumps into Braulio (Aarón Díaz). She keeps bumping into him in various places, especially school. Braulio was orphaned when he was about twelve years old.

He lives with his wicked aunt; his kind, but oblivious uncle; and his cruel cousin, Esteban (Jorge de Silva). Braulio has a friend named Conny (Sherlyn) who tries to date him, but he isn't interested. Conny absolutely hates Diana as he is attracted to her. Braulio later finds out that Diana comes from a rich background, something Diana never told him, which leads to them splitting up. Diana later ends up dating Esteban, not knowing that he is Braulio's wicked cousin.

The plot, in essence, tells the story of several teens in a school. The story lines are designed to affect pre-teen minds: The orphan Braulio, Diana at her boarding school, and Connie and her parents winning the lottery, to name just a few.

In addition to all this, when Aunt Pilar (Erika Buenfil) first registers Diana into school, she meets her long lost love, Álvaro, who works at the school. Álvaro also works with Emma, who has feelings for him, but now that Pilar is back in the picture, Álvaro only has eyes for Pilar.

Things change when Alvaro mistakenly thinks Pilar is married, and sleeps with Emma. After finding out his mistake, Álvaro goes back to Pilar, but keeps his affair with Emma a secret, even when Pilar asks if there was anything going on.

The jealous Emma finds out that Álvaro is dating Pilar after seeing the two at a restaurant. She later discovers she is pregnant and lies to Álvaro, telling him that she is positive that he is the father. (She doesn't mention that she had also slept with Esteban.)

Cast 
 
Erika Buenfil as Pilar de la Reguera
Arturo Peniche as Álvaro Riverol
Sara Maldonado as Diana Antillón de la Reguera
Aarón Díaz as Braulio Valladares Stone
Sherlyn as Concepción "Conny" Pérez Ávila
Jorge de Silva as Esteban Molina Valladares
Arleth Terán as Emma Martinez
Marco Muñoz as Domenico Antillón
Susy-Lu Peña as Nancy
Uberto Bondoni as Rolando
René Casados as Dante Lacalfari
Maritza Olivares as Amalia Valladares
Mariagna Prats as Irene de la Reguera
Manuela Ímaz as Isadora Moret Rivadeneira
Alex Sirvent as Eduardo Arellano Gómez
Mariana Sánchez Williams as Artemisa Madrigal Tovar
Miguel Ángel Biaggio as Samuel Cisneros Castro
Belinda as Elena "Elenita" Arellano Gómez
Christina Pastor as Olga
Daniel Berlanga as Damián
Daniel Habif as Alberto
Nancy Taira as Coral
Paola Riquelme as Enriqueta
Ricardo Margaleff as Antonio
Rodrigo Tejeda as Joaquín
Ximena Herrera as Malkah
Ramon Valdés as Jesús "Chucho" Pérez Ávila
Haydeé Navarra as Bianca de la Torre
Luis Fonsi as Roy
Aarón Hernán as Arthur
Raymundo Capetillo as Daniel Molina
Manuel Saval as Osvaldo Madrigal
Nicky Mondellini as Lourdes "Lulú" Gómez
María Marcela as Sofía
Lucero Lander as Julieta
Beatriz Moreno as Francisca "Paquita" Ávila
Pedro Romo as Alfonso "Poncho" Pérez
Oscar Traven as Sebastián
Archie Lafranco as Paul
Marcela Páez as Gabriela Tovar
Queta Lavat as Gudelia
Francisco Avendaño as Ulises Gómez
Javier Herranz as Padre Anselmo
Isadora González as Bárbara Magallanes
Maricarmen Vela as Mercedes
Rafael del Villar as Professor Muñoz
Rubén Morales as Adrián Romo
Fernando Carrera as Dr. Ernesto Torres
Gina Pedret as Dulce María
Karla Barahona as Lilia
Beatriz Aguirre as Victoria Vda. de Antillón
Nestor Emmanuel as Javier
Blanca Sánchez as Martha
Jacqueline Voltaire as Sra. Kullman
Angelique Boyer as Anette

Awards

References

External links

 at esmas.com 

2004 telenovelas
Mexican telenovelas
2004 Mexican television series debuts
2004 Mexican television series endings
Spanish-language telenovelas
Television series about teenagers
Television shows set in Mexico
Televisa telenovelas